Villette is a commune in the Meurthe-et-Moselle department in north-eastern France.

Geography

Climate

Villette has a oceanic climate (Köppen climate classification Cfb).

See also
Communes of the Meurthe-et-Moselle department

References

Communes of Meurthe-et-Moselle